Edward Williams (died c. 1594) was an English politician.

He was a member (MP) of the Parliament of England for Camelford in 1571 and for St. Ives in 1572.

References

Year of birth missing
1590s deaths
Members of the pre-1707 English Parliament for constituencies in Cornwall
English MPs 1571
English MPs 1572–1583